The Possibilities were a rock band from Athens, Georgia formed in 1991. Their sound was described as "psychedelia-tinged alt country" and "country-skronk".

History
Formed in 1991 by Kevin Lane (vocals, guitar), Bob Spires (bass guitar), and Matt Lane (drums, vocals), the band did not release anything other than a self-released cassette until their self-titled 1999 debut album, by which time the line-up had expanded to include Chris Grehan (guitar, vocals) and Jason Gonzalez (keyboards, vocals). The debut album was described by Allmusic as "country-skronk". Prior to this the band had acted as backing for Jack Logan (playing on Buzz Me In and Monkey Paw) and Todd McBride (on Sketchy). The band's sound was described as "psychedelia-tinged alt country", drawing comparisons with Flaming Lips, Apples in Stereo, and Outrageous Cherry.

The indie 'Supergroup' Minus 5 covered a Possibilities song, "You Don't Mean it" on their Let the War Against Music Begin.

The band's second album, Way Out, described by Allmusic as "a pure psych-pop delight", was released in 2002 by Parasol Records, and was their last release.

Discography

Albums
Scattered, Smothered, Covered and Chunked (1995), self-released cassette
The Possibilities (1999), Backburner
Way Out (2002), Parasol

Singles
"Invisible" (2001), Seed & Feed

References

Indie rock musical groups from Georgia (U.S. state)
Musical groups from Athens, Georgia